Afferden may refer to:

 Afferden, Limburg, Netherlands
 Afferden, Gelderland, Netherlands